is a passenger railway station located in the city of Fuchū, Tokyo, Japan, operated by the private railway operator Keio Corporation.

Lines 
Nakagawara Station is served by the Keio Line, and is located 24.7 kilometers from the starting point of the line at Shinjuku Station.

Station layout 
This station consists of two elevated opposed side platforms serving two tracks,  with the station building located underneath.

Platforms

History
The station opened on March 24, 1925. A new station building was completed in July 1974.

Passenger statistics
In fiscal 2019, the station was used by an average of 25,845 passengers daily. 

The passenger figures (boarding passengers only) for previous years are as shown below.

Surrounding area
 Nakagawara Post Office

See also
 List of railway stations in Japan

References

External links

Keio Railway Station Information 

Keio Line
Stations of Keio Corporation
Railway stations in Tokyo
Railway stations in Japan opened in 1925
Fuchū, Tokyo